The Ambassador of the United Kingdom to Italy is the United Kingdom's foremost diplomatic representative in the Italian Republic, and head of the UK's diplomatic mission in Italy. The official title is His Britannic Majesty's Ambassador to the Italian Republic (until 1946, the Kingdom of Italy). The first British mission to the united Italy was a legation located in Turin, taking over the now defunct mission to the Kingdom of Sardinia-Piedmont; it moved to Rome in 1871. The mission was upgraded to a full embassy in 1876.

The office incorporates that of Ambassador of the United Kingdom to the Most Serene Republic of San Marino.

Heads of mission

Envoy Extraordinary and Minister Plenipotentiary
 1861–1863: Sir James Hudson
 1863–1867: Henry Elliot
 1867–1876: Sir Augustus Paget

Ambassador
 1876–1883: Sir Augustus Paget
 1883–1888: Sir John Savile
 1888–1892: The Marquess of Dufferin and Ava
 1892–1893: Hussey Vivian, 3rd Baron Vivian
 1893–1898: Sir Clare Ford
 1898–1903: Philip Currie, 1st Baron Currie
 1903–1904: Sir Francis Bertie
 1905–1908: Sir Edwin Egerton
 1908–1919: Sir Rennell Rodd
 1919–1921: Sir George Buchanan
 1921–1933: Sir Ronald Graham
 1933–1939: The Earl of Perth
 1939–1940: Sir Percy Loraine
No representation 1940–1944 due to World War II
 1944–1947: Sir Noel Charles
 1947–1953: Sir Victor Mallet
 1953–1962: Sir Ashley Clarke
 1962–1966: Sir John Ward
 1966–1969: Sir Evelyn Shuckburgh
 1969–1974: Sir Patrick Hancock
 1974–1976: Sir Guy Millard
 1976–1979: Sir Alan Campbell
 1979–1983: Sir Ronald Arculus
 1983–1987: Thomas Edward Bridges, 2nd Baron Bridges
 1987–1989: Sir Derek Thomas
 1989–1992: Sir Stephen Egerton
 1992–1996: Sir Patrick Fairweather
 1996–2000: Sir Thomas Richardson
 2000–2003: Sir John Shepherd
 2003–2006: Sir Ivor Roberts
 2006–2011: Edward Chaplin
 2011–2016: Christopher Prentice
 2016–2022: Jill Morris

 2022–: Edward Llewellyn, Baron Llewellyn of Steep

References

External links
 UK and Italy, gov.uk

Italy
United Kingdom